The 2011–12 Appalachian State Mountaineers men's basketball team represented Appalachian State University during the 2011–12 NCAA Division I men's basketball season. The Mountaineers, led by 2nd year head coach Jason Capel, played their home games at Holmes Center and are members of the Southern Conference's North Division. They finished the season 13–18, 7–11 in SoCon play to finish in fifth place in the North Division and lost in the quarterfinals of the SoCon tournament to UNC Greensboro.

Roster

Schedule
 
|-
!colspan=9| Regular Season

|- 
!colspan=9| SoCon tournament

References

Appalachian State
Appalachian State Mountaineers men's basketball seasons
Appalachian State
Appalachian State